Andrew Delano Andrews (born May 25, 1993) is an American professional basketball player for Bursaspor of the Turkish Basket League and the EuroCup. He played college basketball for the University of Washington, where he led the Pac-12 Conference in scoring as a senior. After going undrafted in the 2016 NBA Draft, Andrews played professional basketball in Turkey, Latvia and Israel.

High school career
Andrews attended Benson Polytechnic High School under Troy Berry. As a senior, he averaged 24 points, 5 rebounds and 5 assists per game leading Benson to the Oregon Class 5A State Title game. When he graduated, he was considered a three-star recruit by Rivals.com and was ranked 83rd by ESPN among point guard prospects.

College career
Andrews came to Washington from Benson Polytechnic High School in Portland, Oregon. After sitting out the 2011–12 season following hip surgery, Andrews joined the Huskies' regular rotation as a redshirt freshman. As a senior, he averaged 20.9 points per game to lead the conference, and was named first-team All-Pac-12. In his last home game with the Huskies, Andrews scored a career-high 47 points against arch-rival Washington State.

Professional career
After going undrafted in the 2016 NBA draft, Andrews joined the Los Angeles Clippers for the 2016 NBA Summer League.

Charlotte Hornets (2016)
On September 7, 2016, he signed with the Charlotte Hornets, but was later waived on October 20 after appearing in three preseason games.

Best Balikesir (2016–2017)
On December 11, 2016, Andrews signed with Best Balıkesir of the Turkish Super League. In 19 games with Best Balıkesir Andrews averaged 14.2 points, 3.5 rebounds, and 3.2 assists per game.

Delaware 87ers (2017–2018)
On October 17, 2017 Andrews came back to the U.S. and was signed to the Delaware 87ers, the Philadelphia 76ers' G League affiliate.

VEF Rīga (2018–2019)
On November 15, 2018, Andrews signed with Latvian team VEF Rīga of the VTB United League.

Hapoel Afula (2019)
On February 2, 2019, Andrews parted ways with VEF Rīga to join the Israeli team Hapoel Afula for the rest of the season. In 6 games played for Afula, he averaged 26.7 points, 4.5 rebounds, 6.0 assists and 1.7 steals per game.

Büyükçekmece (2019)
On July 20, 2019, Andrews returned to Turkey for a second stint, signing with Büyükçekmece for the 2019–20 season. Andrews averaged 20.7 points, 4.4 assists and 1.5 steals per game.

Maccabi Haifa (2020)
On May 20, 2020, Andrews returned to Israel for a second stint, signing with Maccabi Haifa for the rest of 2019–20 season to replace Gregory Vargas.

Darüşşafaka (2020–2021)
On July 23, 2020, he has signed with Darüşşafaka of the Basketball Super League. Andrews averaged 15.9 points per game.

Türk Telekom (2021)
On June 26 2021, he signed with Türk Telekom. However, on September 4, he was released after the team refused to grant a few days off to return to the United States because of a family matter.

Frutti Extra Bursaspor (2021–2022)
On October 1 2021, Andrews signed with Frutti Extra Bursaspor.

Panathinaikos (2022–2023)
On July 16 2022, Andrews signed a two-year contract with Panathinaikos of the Greek Basket League and the EuroLeague. In November of the same year, he was sidelined out of the team rotation after the acquisition of Dwayne Bacon and subsequently entered into a legal dispute with the club. On March 11 2023, Andrews and Panathinaikos finally reached a settlement agreement, via mediation from the EuroLeague Players Association, and the player was released from his contract. In 4 EuroLeague games, Andrews averaged 8.2 points, 1.5 rebounds and 1.8 assists, while in only 2 domestic matches, he averaged 4.5 points, 1.5 rebounds and 1 assist per contest.

Return to Bursaspor (2023–present)
On March 15, 2023, Andrews made his official return to Turkey and Bursaspor.

References

External links
Washington Huskies bio
RealGM.com Profile

1993 births
Living people
American expatriate basketball people in Greece
American expatriate basketball people in Israel
American expatriate basketball people in Latvia
American expatriate basketball people in Turkey
American men's basketball players
Basketball players from Portland, Oregon
Benson Polytechnic High School alumni
Best Balıkesir B.K. players
BK VEF Rīga players
Bursaspor Basketbol players
Büyükçekmece Basketbol players
Darüşşafaka Basketbol players
Delaware 87ers players
Hapoel Afula players
Maccabi Haifa B.C. players
Panathinaikos B.C. players
Point guards
Shooting guards
Washington Huskies men's basketball players